The Hadimu are an indigenous Bantu ethnic group native to the islands of Zanzibar and Pemba Island.

A now extinct spirit possession cult existed among 19th-century Hadimu women revering a spirit called kitimiri. This cult was described in an 1869 account by a French missionary. The cult faded by the 1920s and was virtually unknown by the 1960s.

References

Zanzibari people